Bam Bam and Celeste is a 2005 comedy film starring Margaret Cho and Bruce Daniels.

Plot
Two friends, Bam Bam and Celeste, embark on a cross country road trip to try their luck on a New York City reality television show.

Cast

References

External links

2005 films
Comedy films about Asian Americans
2000s English-language films
2005 comedy films
2000s American films